Sergey Yanyushkin (born 16 November 1986) is a Russian rugby union player who generally plays as a fly half represents Russia internationally.

He was included in the Russian squad for the 2019 Rugby World Cup which is scheduled to be held in Japan for the first time and also marks his first World Cup appearance.

Career 
He made his international debut for Russia against Spain on 2 February 2013.

References 

Russian rugby union players
Russia international rugby union players
Living people
1986 births
Sportspeople from Penza
Rugby union fly-halves
Lokomotiv Penza players